Richard Blunt was Archdeacon of Totnes during 1265.

References

Archdeacons of Totnes